Caleb Carr is a historian.

Caleb Carr may also refer to:

Caleb Carr (governor)
Caleb Carr (Otsego County, NY) in 60th New York State Legislature
Caleb Carr (Rensselaer County, NY) in 47th New York State Legislature